Baba Laouissi (born 6 October 1943) is a former football referee from the African state of Morocco. He is known for having officiated at the 1988 Olympic football tournament in Seoul, South Korea, as well as 1986 World Cup qualifiers.

References

External links 
 
 

1943 births
Moroccan football referees
Living people
Olympic football referees